Billy Mwanza (born 21 January 1983) is a Zambian former footballer who played as a defender.

External links

1983 births
Living people
Zambian footballers
Zambia international footballers
Zambian expatriate footballers
2008 Africa Cup of Nations players
Chinese Super League players
Expatriate footballers in China
Changsha Ginde players
Zambian expatriate sportspeople in China
Power Dynamos F.C. players
ZESCO United F.C. players
Association football defenders
2006 Africa Cup of Nations players
African Warriors F.C. players